Babayan or Babaian is an Armenian surname and may refer to:

 Agasi Babayan (born 1921), Armenian film director, screenwriter, and actor
Araxie Babayan (1906–1993), Armenian chemist
 Boris Babayan (born 1933), Armenian supercomputer architect
 Grigori Babayan (born 1980), Kazakhstani footballer of Armenian descent
 Khachik Babayan (born 1956), Iranian violin player
 Roksana Babayan (born 1946), Soviet and Russian pop singer and actress
 Samvel Babayan (born 1965), Armenian general
 Sergei Babayan (born 1961), Armenian-American concert pianist
 Vahram Babayan (born 1948), Armenian composer, pianist and music theorist

Armenian-language surnames